Total Drama Action (abbreviated TDA) is a Canadian animated television series. It is the second season of Total Drama. The show premiered on Teletoon at 6:30pm ET/PT on January 11, 2009. This season was also created by the makers of 6teen, another Teletoon program. This is the only season for Teletoon not to air a new episode every week.

Plot
Like Total Drama Island, the previous season of Total Drama, much of Total Drama Action chronicles the events of the eponymous fictional reality show. The Total Drama series itself is an "animated reality television series," which stars the cast and crew of the fictional series, parodying many aspects of reality television. After last season's winner forgoes their prize money of C$100,000 (US$73,129.00) for a challenge (open to all 22 of Total Drama Island contestants) in which the winner would receive C$1,000,000 (US$731,485.00), the money was left in limbo after a situation resulted in a 14-way tie.

As such, show host Chris McLean (voiced by Christian Potenza) had no choice but to commission a second season with all 14 tied contestants. Two weeks after the aforementioned tie, the contestants who tied are told to arrive at an abandoned movie studio lot in Toronto, Ontario, where the new season, titled Total Drama Action, would take place. Due to its location, Chris told the contestants that the challenges would all be in the form of various movie genres. The accommodations of the contestants are handled by the underpaid Chef Hatchet (Clé Bennett), similar to how it was handled in the previous season. The outhouse, which was used as a confessional in Total Drama Island, has been replaced with a makeup trailer. 

After the quick elimination of two contestants, the couple Bridgette (Kristin Fairlie) and Geoff (Dan Petronijevic), a second challenge determined the team captains of the two competing teams: the Screaming Gaffers, headed by Gwen (Megan Fahlenbock), and the Killer Grips, headed by Trent (Scott McCord). From then on, challenges would alternate between "reward challenges" where winners would receive a special prize, and "elimination challenges" where the losing team would vote off one of its own in an elaborate "Gilded Chris Ceremony".

The pattern of reducing the contestants down was briefly interrupted on two occasions: once when Izzy (Katie Crown) was reinstated following a voting irregularity where her alter-ego, "E-Scope", was voted off, and another time when Courtney (Emilie-Claire Barlow), a contestant who did not originally qualify for Total Drama Action, successfully sued the show and was added into the game. The players eliminated would make the "Walk of Shame" and into the "Lame-o-sine", where they leave the movie studio.

Once seven contestants were left, the Screaming Gaffers and the Killer Grips were dissolved, and the challenges became more individual-oriented. Chris hired Owen as his ringer to sabotage the other contestants and to create drama. Eventually, two contestants were left standing: Duncan (Drew Nelson) and Beth (Sarah Gadon), with both contestants being considered official winners depending on the country of airing.

Episodes

Total Drama Action premiered on January 11, 2009, at 6:30 p.m. on Teletoon and premiered on June 11, 2009, on Cartoon Network. In the U.S., Cartoon Network creates a disclaimer with a TV-PG-D rating before the previous show's recap. In the UK it aired on April 11, 2011, at 10:00 GMT as part of Disney XD's Easter Shows.

Episode finale variations
The show's producers created two alternate endings for the final episode, such that the winner seen in one country's broadcasts is the runner-up in other countries (and vice versa) where the show airs. In Canada, Duncan was aired as the winner as well as in Denmark, Latin America, Norway, the Philippines, and in the United States. Beth is also depicted as the winner in airings from Australia, Brazil, Bulgaria, Croatia, Finland, France, Hungary, Israel, Italy, the Netherlands, New Zealand, Poland, Portugal, Romania, Russia, Serbia, Singapore, Spain, South Africa, Sweden, and the United Kingdom.

Characters 
The main Total Drama Action cast consists of host Chris McLean, assistant Chef Hatchet, and the contestants that make up the castmates. The remaining contestants from Total Drama Island also appear in the show but serving in lesser capacities as commentators on The Aftermath.

Staff

Contestants

Elimination

Color Key
  Finalist: This contestant made it to the final of the competition.
  Win: This contestant won the challenge and/or was immune from elimination.
  Safe: This contestant was safe from elimination.
  Exempt: This contestant was exempt from elimination.
  Low: This contestant was at risk of being eliminated.
  Eliminated: This contestant was eliminated.
  Eliminated: This contestant quit, was evacuated, or got disqualified.
  This contestant is out of the competition.

Production 

Like Total Drama Island, Total Drama Action was developed and produced by Fresh TV, targeting an age group of 10-to 16-year-olds. Many of the show's settings, as well as the show's opening sequence, are deliberately made to be as close as to their Total Drama Island counterparts as possible; Camp Wawanakwa, the setting of Total Drama Island, was also revisited on several occasions, most notably as the site of some of the season's challenges. All of the cast of Total Drama Island return in the same roles as that of Total Drama Island, though some had their roles reduced as their characters were not as prominent in this season. As with Total Drama Island, two endings were commissioned for the series, one with each of the final two competitors winning; after the airing of the penultimate episode and prior to the season finale, viewers were prompted to the show's website (either at Teletoon for viewers in Canada or Cartoon Network for American viewers) to vote for the desired ending. Unlike Total Drama Island, however, the alternate ending was available as a webcast on the show's website immediately following its airing.

Reception

Total Drama Action has received generally positive reviews from critics and fans, though not as much as its predecessor. Most critics agree the season does not live up to the first season, Total Drama Island, and others say that the season was more "childish" and "bad". However, some critics and fans did enjoy Total Drama Action as much as the first season along with a majority of critics praising the character development of the characters who had small roles in the first season. Total Drama Action received a 7.6 on Metacritic by fans, which indicates "generally favorable reviews". Like the critics, many fans believed that this season did not live up to the previous season, Total Drama Island.

Media

DVD releases
Total Drama Action has only been publicly sold on DVD in Australia. The first half of the season was released on a Region 4 DVD, on November 2, 2011."  The second half of the season was released exclusively to Australia, on July 4, 2012.

See also

Notes

References

External links

Total Drama Action Interactive
A TDA Podcast
Total Drama Action.com

Action
2009 Canadian television series debuts
2000s Canadian animated television series
2010s Canadian animated television series
2000s Canadian satirical television series
2010s Canadian satirical television series
Canadian adult animated action television series
Canadian children's animated action television series
Canadian adult animated comedy television series
Canadian children's animated comedy television series
Canadian flash animated television series
Television shows set in Toronto
Television shows set in Ontario
Television shows filmed in Toronto
2009 Canadian television seasons
2010 Canadian television seasons